Rissa is a former municipality in the old Sør-Trøndelag county in Norway in the Fosen region.  The municipality existed from 1860 until its dissolution on 1 January 2018 when it became part of the municipality of Indre Fosen in Trøndelag county.  The administrative centre of the municipality was the village of Årnset.  Other villages in the municipality included Askjem, Hasselvika, Husbysjøen, Rørvika, Råkvåg, and Stadsbygd.

Prior to its dissolution in 2018, the  municipality was the 179th largest by area out of the then 426 municipalities in Norway. Rissa was the 158th most populous municipality in Norway with a population of 6,628.

The municipality was located on the southern end of the Fosen peninsula along the Trondheimsfjord and the Stjørnfjord.  The large lake Storvatnet lies on the eastern border with Lensvik.  To the north were the municipalities of Åfjord, Bjugn, and Ørland.

The Flakk–Rørvik Ferry crosses the Trondheimsfjord connecting the village of Rørvik with the city of Trondheim.

History
The former municipality of Rissen was established in 1860 when it was separated from the big municipality of Stadsbygd.  Initially, Rissen had 3,733 residents.  The spelling was later changed to Rissa.  On 1 January 1905, the southwestern district of Lensvik (population: 1,019) on the west side of the Trondheimsfjord was separated from Rissa to form a municipality of its own.  This left Rissa with 3,394 residents.  During the 1960s, there were many municipal mergers across Norway due to the work of the Schei Committee. On 1 January 1964, most of Stadsbygd municipality (except for the Ingdalen area) and the southern part of the municipality of Stjørna were merged with Rissa to form a new, enlarged municipality of Rissa. On 1 January 2018, the neighboring municipalities of Rissa and Leksvik merged to form the new municipality of Indre Fosen which became part of the new Trøndelag county on the same date.

Landslide
An area of  sent  of quick clay slid down into the shores of Botn. The landslip caused a tsunami to strike the north shore at Leira, which destroyed a saw mill and flooded several houses. Out of the 40 people who were in the area at the time of the slide, one person died. A large portion of the slide was recorded on film by two amateur photographers. Almost four years after the event, a new road and stabilisation work in the area had removed most traces of the slide. The area being returned to agricultural use.

Name
The municipality (originally the parish) was historically named "Rissen", or more recently spelled "Rissa". This was probably the old name of the brackish basin of Botn (literally "the bottom" of the fjord). Even though this is a heavily land-locked fjord with a river-like inlet from the Trondheimsfjord (it was probably a shallow bay in prehistoric times). The name is probably derived from the verb  which means "raise" or "rise".

Coat of arms
The coat of arms was granted on 23 January 1987 and it was in use until 1 January 2018 when the municipality was dissolved. The official blazon is "Vert, a chaplet of three quatrefoils argent". This means the arms have a green field (background) and the charge is a chaplet (crown) with three quatrefoils. The charge has a tincture of argent which means it is commonly colored white, but if it is made out of metal, then silver is used. The crown design was chosen to symbolize a similar crown of Skule Bårdsson that is depicted on an old tombstone at the Nidaros Cathedral. Bårdsson was the founder of Rein kloster at the Rein estate (which he also owned) in Rissa. The crown is a typical headdress used by the medieval Norwegian dukes. Typically, there are five quatrefoils on a crown like this, but Rissa has only three to symbolize the three municipalities that were merged in 1964 to form Rissa (Rissa, Stadsbygd, and Stjørna). The arms were designed by Oscar Bergsaune. The municipal flag has the same design as the coat of arms.

Government
While it existed, this municipality was responsible for primary education (through 10th grade), outpatient health services, senior citizen services, unemployment and other social services, zoning, economic development, and municipal roads. During its existence, this municipality was governed by a municipal council of elected representatives, which in turn elected a mayor.

Municipal council 
The municipal council  of Rissa was made up of 23 representatives that are elected to four year terms.  The party breakdown of the final municipal council was as follows:

Mayors
The mayors of Rissa:

1860–1863: Henrik Horneman 
1864–1865: Svend Busch Schmidt
1866–1869: Eiler Hagerup Nannestad
1870–1873: Svend Busch Schmidt
1874–1875: Thomas Horneman
1876–1881: Ebbe Bakøen
1882–1895: Torger Halten (V)
1896–1897: Ole H. Rokseth (H)
1898-1898: Torger Halten (V)
1899–1902: Fredrik Horneman (H)
1903–1904: Ole H. Rokseth (H)
1905–1907: Bernt Johannes Ræder (V)
1908–1910: Andreas H. Berg (V)
1911–1916: Bernt Johannes Ræder (V)
1917–1919: Johan A. Dybdahl (V)
1920–1922: Elias Aalmo (V)
1923–1925: Peter L. Kimo (Bp)
1926–1928: Elias Aalmo (V)
1929–1931: Peter L. Kimo (Bp)
1932–1934: Gustav J. Krognes (Bp)
1935–1941: Peter L. Kimo (Bp)
1942–1945: Martin Aalmo (NS)
1945-1945: Peter L. Kimo (Bp)
1946–1947: Martin Skaug (V)
1948–1954: Henrik O. Grenne (Bp)
1955-1955: Petter Åsarød (V)
1956–1959: Marentzius Selven (LL)
1960–1967: Andreas Fallin (Sp)
1968–1971: Arne Holten (V)
1972–1979: Magnar Indseth (Sp)
1980–1985: Johan Arnt Sannan (H)
1986–1991: Olav Lindgaard (Sp)
1992–1995: Ivar Dybdahl (Sp)
1995–1998: Astrid Rathe (V)
1998–2011: Per Skjærvik (V)
2011–2017: Ove Vollan (H)
2017-2017: Liv Darell (Sp)

Economy

Fosen Yards
One major employer in Rissa is Fosen Yard AS. Opened in 1972 as Fosen Mekaniske Verksteder, it has built a number of vessels used in Norway and abroad:

 MV Blue Puttees - ferry with Marine Atlantic - ferry with Marine Atlantic
 MV Highlanders - ferry with Marine Atlantic
 MV Leif Ericson - ferry with Marine Atlantic

Churches 

The Church of Norway had four parishes within the municipality of Rissa. It was part of the Fosen prosti (deanery) in the Diocese of Nidaros.

See also 
 List of former municipalities of Norway

References

External links 

 The Quick Clay Landslide at Rissa (Youtube video)
 

 
1860 establishments in Norway
2018 disestablishments in Norway
Former municipalities of Norway
Landslides in 1978
Populated places disestablished in 2018
Populated places established in 1860